Pilocrocis granjae is a moth in the family Crambidae. It was described by F. Hoffmann in 1934. It is found in Mexico.

References

Pilocrocis
Moths described in 1934
Moths of Central America